Dame Carole Jordan,  (born 19 July 1941) is a British physicist, astrophysicist, astronomer and academic. Currently, she is Professor Emeritus of Astrophysics at the University of Oxford and Emeritus Fellow at Somerville College, Oxford. From 1994 to 1996, she was President of the Royal Astronomical Society; she was the first woman to hold this appointment. She won the Gold Medal of the Royal Astronomical Society in 2005; she was only the third female recipient following Caroline Herschel in 1828 and Vera Rubin in 1996. She was head of the Rudolf Peierls Centre for Theoretical Physics at the University of Oxford from 2003 to 2004 and 2005 to 2008, and was one of the first female professors in Astronomy in Britain. She was made a Dame Commander of the Order of the British Empire in 2006 for services to physics and astronomy.

Education
Carole Jordan was educated at Harrow County Grammar School for Girls and at University College London (BSc 1962; PhD 1965). Her first paper, written while she was still an undergraduate, was on the distortion of lunar craters.

Her PhD studies under C. W. Allen opened up a new field in atomic physics and included identification of iron and other lines in the solar extreme ultra-violet spectrum and the ZETA experiment, early ionisation-balance calculations, development of density-diagnostic methods using the iron lines, calculation of relative element abundances and modelling from emission-measure distributions.

Her first paper on coronal research, "The Relative Abundance of Silicon Iron and Nickel in the Solar Corona" was published in 1965.

Scientific work
Jordan calculated the ionisation balance of elements, including the effects of density-dependent di-electronic recombination, level populations in ions, and combined this with observational results from the Sun and stars. As a result of her work on the Skylab ultraviolet spectra the understanding of He-like ions was further developed. This had implications for the development of applications, like X-ray lasers.  The electron density diagnostics, and temperature density diagnostics, when combined with the emission measure analysis developed by her yielded new insights in the chromospheres of cool stars, T Tauri Stars, and the Sun, to name a few.  The 1970 solar eclipse allowed her the identification of previously unknown forbidden lines in the Sun. Following the launch of the International Ultraviolet Explorer satellite in 1978, she turned her attention to stellar corona and chromospheric activity.  Her knowledge of solar activity enabled her to help develop this new branch of astrophysics and identify many elements in stellar spectra as well. Since about 1980, she has been a key member of nearly every team, in the UK, Europe and the US, concerned with the development and use of instruments for the studies of ultra-violet and x-ray spectra of the Sun and of the stars.

Career

 Research associate, Joint Institute for Laboratory Astrophysics, University of Colorado, Boulder, 1966

 Assistant Lecturer, Department of Astronomy, UCL, attached to the Spectroscopy Division of UKAEA Culham Laboratory, 1966–69
During this time, she completed her ionisation-balance calculations and the identification of some forbidden lines and satellite lines. In 1969, she started to devise methods to obtain the structure of the solar transition region.
 Astrophysics Research Unit, Culham Laboratory:
 Post-doctoral research assistant, 1969–71
 Senior Scientific Officer, 1971–73
 Principal Scientific Officer, 1973–76
 Wolfson Tutorial Fellow in Natural Science, Somerville College, Oxford, 1976 -
 University of Oxford: reader in physics, 1994–96, professor of physics 1996-, head of the Rudolf Peierls Centre for Theoretical Physics, 2003–2008, emeritus professor 2008 -.

She has published papers on astrophysical plasma spectroscopy and structure and energy balance in cool star coronae.

Dame Jordan has her picture displayed with the National Portrait Gallery as a recognition for her career achievements.

Affiliations
 Royal Astronomical Society: Fellow, 1966; secretary, 1981–90; vice-president, 1990–91 and 1996–97; president, 1994–96.
 Member of the International Astronomical Union, 1967
 Editor of The Observatory, 1968–73
 Fellow of the Institute of Physics, 1973
 Fellow of the Royal Society, 1990
 Doctor of the University of Surrey, 1991
 Member of the Science and Engineering Research Council, 1985-90 (Chairman, Solar System Committee, 1983–86; Member, Astronomy, Space and Radio Board, 1979–86; Member, Astronomy and Planetary Science Board, 1986–90)
 Member of the Particle Physics and Astronomy Research Council, 1994–97

Damehood
Carole Jordan was created a Dame Commander of the Order of the British Empire (DBE) on 17 June 2006.

References

External links
 Personal page

1941 births
Living people
Women astronomers
British women physicists
Alumni of University College London
Dames Commander of the Order of the British Empire
Female Fellows of the Royal Society
Fellows of the Institute of Physics
Honorary Fellows of the Institute of Physics
Academics of University College London
Recipients of the Gold Medal of the Royal Astronomical Society
Fellows of Somerville College, Oxford
Academics of the University of Oxford
Presidents of the Royal Astronomical Society
Fellows of the Royal Society
20th-century British astronomers
21st-century British astronomers
20th-century British women scientists
21st-century British women scientists